Tabea Blumenschein (11 August 1952 – 2 March 2020) was a German painter, actress, film director, screenwriter, costume/set designer and musician.

Blumenschein was born in Konstanz. She studied art at Kunstschule Konstanz and moved to Berlin in 1973. She starred in 5 films by Ulrike Ottinger. She designed the collection "Big Birds" for Berlin Knitweardesigner Claudia Skoda which was presented at Berlin Kongresshalle in 1979. She was awarded the Deutscher Filmpreis in Gold 1981 for her Setdesign for the Film "Looping". She collaborated with the performance art and music group Die Tödliche Doris and recorded with Gudrun Gut, Bettina Koester, Frieder Butzmann, and with Die Dominas. Blumenschein died in Berlin, aged 67.

Filmography
 Laokoon & Söhne  (Ulrike Ottinger and Tabea Blumenschein 1973)
   (Die Betörung der blauen Matrosen), (Ulrike Ottinger and Tabea Blumenschein 1975)
 Portrait Marianne Rosenberg, (Rosa von Praunheim 1976) 
 Madame X: An Absolute Ruler (Madame X – Eine absolute Herrscherin), (Ulrike Ottinger 1978)
 Ticket of No Return (Bildnis einer Trinkerin), (Ulrike Ottinger 1979)
 Taxi zum Klo, (Frank Ripploh, 1980)
 Das Graupelberhuhn (Die Tödliche Doris 1982)
 Sportliche Schatten – Kunst in Krisenzeiten (black&white, S-8, with Udo Kier, direction and script: Tabea Blumenschein 1982)
 Uliisses, (Werner Nekes 1982)
 . (Ulrike Ottinger 1984)
 Zagarbata, (director and script: Tabea Blumenschein, 1985)

References

External links 
 
 

1952 births
2020 deaths
People from Konstanz
German film actresses
Film people from Baden-Württemberg
German women film directors